Daniel Kipngetich Komen (born 17 May 1976) is a Kenyan middle- and long-distance runner. Remembered for his rivalry with Haile Gebrselassie, his most notable achievements came in a two-year period between 1996 and 1998, during which he broke a string of world records.

Komen currently holds the world record in the 3000 metres with a time of 7:20.67 set in 1996. With his 7.58.61 world best in the 2-mile race set in 1997, he remains the only man in history to run back-to-back sub-four-minute miles, splitting circa 3:59.4 on both the first and second half of the race. He is also the Kenyan record holder for the 5000 metres both outdoors and indoors.

Komen was the second man, after Saïd Aouita, to break the 3-minute mark for the 1500 m, the 7-minute mark for 3000 m, and the 13-minute mark for the 5000 m.

Early life
Komen was born in Elgeyo Marakwet District. He is from the Keiyo sub-tribe of Kalenjin people and grew up in a rural area of Kenya's Rift Valley Province. One of fourteen children, Komen began running at the age of seven as a means of getting to and from school. His running abilities were discovered and at the age of 14 he travelled to Australia. Komen had an exceptional junior career: at age 17, he placed second at the World Junior Cross Country Championships, and in 1994, he became the World Junior Champion in the 5,000 meters and 10,000 meters.

Career
Komen first appeared in the senior ranks in 1994 when he won a place on Kenya's 10,000 m team for the 1994 Commonwealth Games, placing ninth. The next year, at the Golden Gala meet in Rome, Komen set the world junior record in the 5,000m with a time of 12:56.15, helping pace Moses Kiptanui to a world record in the process.

In 1996, Komen began to dominate the 5,000 m. On 1 September 1996 in Rieti, Italy, Komen ran a spectacular world record time of 7:20.67 in the 3000 metres, breaking Noureddine Morceli's former record by 4.44 seconds.

A year later, Komen made history again. In Hechtel, Belgium, Komen became the first (and so far only) man to run two miles in under eight minutes, clocking a world record 7:58.61. His first mile was faster than Roger Bannister's first-ever sub-four, while his second equalled it. Just seven months later, at an Australian athletics meet in Sydney, Komen ran 7:58.91, missing his world record by 0.30 seconds.

In August 1997 he broke the 5000 m world record and took two seconds off of Haile Gebrselassie's best to bring it to 12:39.74.

Only twelve days after the previous world record of 7:26.15 was set by Haile Gebrselassie, Komen broke the indoor 3,000-metre record with a time of 7:24.90, set in Budapest on 6 February 1998. This mark is still referred to as "Mount Everest" in athletics circles and has been bettered only twice outdoors, one of them being Komen's own world record. Kenenisa Bekele believes that breaking Komen's record is only "possible on a special day if the pace is good and if everything else also is perfect."

Other accolades include being the 1997 World Championships in Athletics and 1998 Commonwealth Games 5,000-meter champion.  He won the 5000 metres race at the 1998 IAAF World Cup.

Out of the limelight since the late 1990s, Komen now serves as chairman of the Keiyo North Rift Athletics Association and as co-director of a private school with his wife, Joyce.

Achievements

Personal bests
Daniel Komen's personal bests, and their place on the world ranking of all times, unless otherwise noted. All times and placings are taken from Komen's World Athletics bio.

International competitions

References

Bibliography

External links
 
 Kimbia Athletics profile (archive.org)
 Highlight footage of his 7:58.61 record for 2 miles
 Video recording of Komen's outdoor 3,000m record
 A biographical article "What Ever Happened to Daniel Komen?" that includes much race information from Komen's career 

1976 births
Living people
People from Elgeyo-Marakwet County
Kenyan male long-distance runners
Kenyan male middle-distance runners
Kenyan male cross country runners
Commonwealth Games gold medallists for Kenya
Commonwealth Games medallists in athletics
Athletes (track and field) at the 1994 Commonwealth Games
Athletes (track and field) at the 1998 Commonwealth Games
Goodwill Games medalists in athletics
World Athletics Championships athletes for Kenya
World Athletics Championships medalists
World Athletics record holders
World Athletics indoor record holders
World Athletics Championships winners
Competitors at the 1998 Goodwill Games
Medallists at the 1998 Commonwealth Games